Iliniza Sur is a mountain in the Andes of Ecuador.

See also
List of mountains in the Andes

Mountains of Ecuador